Cephalanthera, abbreviated Ceph in horticultural trade, is a genus of mostly terrestrial orchids. Members of this genus have rhizomes rather than tubers. About 15 species are currently recognized, most of them native to Europe and Asia. The only species found in the wild in North America is Cephalanthera austiniae, the phantom orchid or snow orchid. Ecologically, this species is partially myco-heterotrophic. Some of the Eurasian species hybridise.

Several of the European species have common names including the word "helleborine", though orchids in other genera are also called helleborines. In addition to those listed here, very large numbers of other specific names will be found in the older literature, but these are almost all synonyms for the best known species such as C. longifolia or C. damasonium, the European white helleborine.

Species accepted as of May 2014 are:

Cephalanthera alpicola Fukuy. - Taiwan
Cephalanthera austiniae (A.Gry) Heller - British Columbia, Washington, Oregon, Idaho, California
Cephalanthera calcarata Chen & Lang - Yunnan
Cephalanthera caucasica Krzl. - Iran, southern European Russia, Azerbaijan, Armenia, Republic of Georgia
Cephalanthera cucullata Boiss. & Heldr. - Crete
Cephalanthera damasonium (Mill.) Druce - Europe and the Middle East from England and Sweden to Russia and Iran; also Bhutan, India, Myanmar and Yunnan
Cephalanthera epipactoides Fischer & C. A. Meyer - Greece, Turkey
Cephalanthera erecta (Thunb.) Blume - China, Japan, Korea, Kuril Islands, Bhutan, Assam, eastern Himalayas
Cephalanthera ericiflora Szlach. & Mytnik - Laos
Cephalanthera exigua Seidenf. - Laos, Thailand
Cephalanthera falcata (Thunb.) Blume - China, Japan, Korea
Cephalanthera gracilis S.C.Chen & G.H.Zhu - Yunnan
Cephalanthera humilis X.H.Jin - Yunnan
Cephalanthera kotschyana Renz & Taub. - Turkey, Azerbaijan, Armenia, Republic of Georgia
Cephalanthera kurdica Bornm. ex Kraenzl. - Turkey, Azerbaijan, Armenia, Republic of Georgia, Iran, Iraq, southern European Russia
Cephalanthera longibracteata Blume - China, Japan, Korea, Russian Far East
Cephalanthera longifolia (L.) Fritsch - widespread across Europe, Asia and north Africa from Ireland and Morocco to China
Cephalanthera × mayeri (E.Mayer & Zimmerm.) A.Camus in E.G.Camus & A.A.Camus - Germany (C. damasonium × C. rubra)
Cephalanthera nanchuanica (S.C.Chen) X.H.Jin & X.G.Xiang - Sichuan
Cephalanthera × otto-hechtii G.Keller in G.Keller & al. - Austria, Switzerland (C. longifolia × C. rubra)
Cephalanthera pusilla (Hook.f.) Seidenf. - Myanmar, China
Cephalanthera × renzii B.Baumann & al.. - Azerbaijan (C. caucasica × C. longifolia)Cephalanthera rubra (L.) Rich. - Europe, North Africa and southwest Asia from England, Spain and Morocco to Russia and IranCephalanthera × schaberi Baum. - European Turkey	(C. epipactoides × C. longifolia)Cephalanthera × schulzei E.G.Camus in E.G.Camus, P.Bergon & A.A.Camus - Austria, Germany, France, Turkey, the former Yugoslavia (C. damasonium × C. longifolia)Cephalanthera × taubenheimii H.Baumann - Turkey (C. damasonium × C. kotschyana)''

References

External links
 Jepson Manual Treatment

 
Neottieae genera